Planomonospora is a genus in the phylum Actinomycetota (Bacteria).

Etymology
The name Planomonospora is derived from ancient Greek. Planos meaning wanderer or vagabond, monos meaning solitary, single and spora meaning a seed, or in biological context a spore. The name therefore describes a motile organism with a single endospore.

Species
The genus contains four species.
 Planomonospora alba Mertz 1994
 Planomonospora parontospora Thiemann et al. 1967
 Planomonospora sphaerica Mertz 1994
 Planomonospora venezuelensis Thiemann 1970

See also
 Bacterial taxonomy
 Microbiology

References 

Bacteria genera
Actinomycetales